Six the Hard Way is the first EP by crossover thrash band Suicidal Tendencies, released on November 17, 1998. Until 2018's Get Your Fight On!, this was the only EP the band had released.

The record features two live recordings and four new tracks. Two of the new tracks, "Freedumb" and "Cyco Vision", went on to appear on their next album the following year.

Track listing

 Tracks 5 and 6 were recorded at Les Eurockéennes de Belfort, France

Credits
Mike Muir – vocals
Mike Clark – guitar
Dean Pleasants – guitar
Josh Paul – bass
Brooks Wackerman – drums

Tracks 1 – 2
 Recorded at Ocean Studios and Skip Saylor, Hollywood, USA
 Produced and mixed by Paul Northfield

Tracks 3 – 4
 Recorded at Titan Studios, Hollywood, USA
 Produced by Suicidal Tendencies
 Engineered by Mike Blum
 Mixed by Paul Northfield at Skip Saylor Studios

Tracks 5 – 6
 Recorded live at Les Eurokeennes de Belfort, France
 Mobile sound engineered by Will Shappland of Manor Mobile
 Suicidal sound engineer – Tony Cooper

External links
Suicidal Tendencies official site

Suicidal Tendencies albums
Suicidal Records albums
1998 debut EPs